The Southampton-class frigates were 32-gun sailing frigates of the fifth rate produced for the Royal Navy. They were designed in 1756 by Sir Thomas Slade, and were the first 'true' fifth-rate frigates produced to the new single-deck concept (that is, without any gunports on the lower deck). They were, however, designed with sweep ports (for rowing) along the lower deck.

Unlike the contemporary sixth-rate frigates of 28 guns, which were derived from French designs by Slade, the Southampton class were fully British-designed.  Unlike the French models, these ships had considerably more height on the lower deck, and were originally intended to work their cables here.

A total of four ships were built in oak during the Seven Years' War, all ordered from private shipyards. The initial design was approved on 12 March 1756, and provided for a ship of 648 37/94 tons burthen, and the contract with Robert Inwood to build the prototype reflected this.  On 25 May the design was modified by Slade to lengthen the ship on the lower deck by 3 inches, and along the keel by 10½ inches, thus raising the tonnage to 652 51/94 burthen; on the same date, the name Southampton was approved for the prototype, and two further ships were ordered to be built to this design, with a fourth vessel being ordered one week later.

Ships in class 
 Southampton
 Ordered: 12 March 1756
 Built by:  Robert Inwood, Rotherhithe.
 Keel laid:  April 1756
 Launched:  5 May 1757
 Completed:  19 June 1757 at Deptford Dockyard.
 Fate:  Wrecked in the Bahamas on 27 November 1812.
 Minerva
 Ordered: 25 May 1756
 Built by:  John Quallet, Rotherhithe.
 Keel laid: 1 June 1756
 Launched:  17 January 1759
 Completed:  3 March 1759 at Deptford Dockyard.
 Fate:  Captured by the French on 22 August 1778. Retaken on 4 January 1781 and renamed Recovery 20 April 1781. Sold at Deptford Dockyard 30 December 1784.
 Vestal
 Ordered: 25 May 1756
 Built by:  John Barnard & John Turner, Harwich.
 Keel laid:  June 1756
 Launched:  17 June 1757
 Completed:  17 August 1757 at the builder's shipyard.
 Fate:  Taken to pieces at Deptford Dockyard in June 1775.
 Diana
 Ordered: 1 June 1756
 Built by: Robert Batson, Limehouse.
 Keel laid:  June 1756
 Launched:  30 August 1757
 Completed:  12 September 1757 at Deptford Dockyard.
 Fate:  Sold at Deptford Dockyard on 16 May 1793.

References 
 Robert Gardiner, The First Frigates, Conway Maritime Press, London 1992. .
 David Lyon, The Sailing Navy List, Conway Maritime Press, London 1993. .
 Rif Winfield, British Warships in the Age of Sail, 1714 to 1792, Seaforth Publishing, London 2007. .

Fifth-rate frigates of the Royal Navy
History of Southampton
Ship classes of the Royal Navy